Pempudu Koduku is a 1953 Indian Telugu-language drama film directed by L. V. Prasad and produced by A. V. Subbarao. The film stars Sivaji Ganesan, Savitri, Pushpavalli and Kanda Mohanbabu.

Cast 
Sivaji Ganesan
Savitri
Pushpavalli
Kanda Mohanbabu
Kumari
S. V. Ranga Rao
L. V. Prasad

Soundtrack 
The music was composed by S. Rajeswara Rao. Lyrics by Vempati Sadasivabrahmam and Sri Sri.

References

External links 

1953 films
1950s Telugu-language films
Indian drama films
Films directed by L. V. Prasad
Indian black-and-white films
1953 drama films